Henry Mesa is a distinctive wedge-shaped mesa  in extent, standing  south of Mulock Glacier on the west side of Heap Glacier, Antarctica. The mesa was mapped by the United States Geological Survey from tellurometer surveys and Navy air photos, 1959–63, and was named by the Advisory Committee on Antarctic Names for Captain B.R. Henry, U.S. Coast Guard, commander of the  during U.S. Navy Operation Deep Freeze 1964, and commander of the U.S. ship group during Deep Freeze 1965.

References

Mesas of Antarctica
Landforms of Oates Land